Zion Acoustic Sessions  is the twelfth live album from the contemporary Christian music band Hillsong United which features the 12 songs from its previous album presented in an acoustic version. The album is available exclusively on iTunes. In the United States, it appeared on the Billboard 200 chart as well as reaching No. 4 on its Top Christian Albums and No. 25 on Top Digital Albums charts.

Track listing

References 

2013 live albums
Hillsong United albums